Chemical Engineering Science is a peer-reviewed scientific journal covering all aspects of chemical engineering. It is published by Elsevier and was established in 1951. The editor-in-chief is A.P.J. Middelberg (University of Queensland).

Abstracting and indexing
The journal is abstracted and indexed in:

According to the Journal Citation Reports, the journal has a 2019 impact factor of 3.871.

References

External links

Chemical engineering journals
Elsevier academic journals
Publications established in 1951
Semi-monthly journals
English-language journals